Oslany is a village and municipality in Prievidza District in the Trenčín Region of western Slovakia.

History

In historical records the village was first mentioned in 1254.

While the Ottomans occupied most of central Europe, the region north of lake Balaton remained in the Kingdom of Hungary.  Until 1918, the town named Oszlány was part of Austria-Hungary, Transleithania after the compromise of 1867.

Geography
It has a population of about 2224 people.

References

External links
 
 
Municipal website

Villages and municipalities in Prievidza District